Friends is a 1938 Soviet biopic film directed by Lev Arnshtam.

Plot
The film is based on the life of Sergey Kirov. During the Russian Civil War, the Communist Party of the Soviet Union sends Aleksey to Caucasus Mountains to help organize an armed uprising.

Cast
 Boris Babochkin - Aleksey
 Irina Zarubina		
 Nikolai Cherkasov - Beta, an Ossetian
 Stepan Kayukov	
 Kote Daushvili	
 Serafima Birman	
 Aleksandr Borisov		
 Ivan Nazarov

External links

1938 films
Lenfilm films
Soviet black-and-white films
Films directed by Lev Arnshtam
Russian Civil War films
Soviet biographical films
Russian biographical films
1930s biographical films
Films scored by Dmitri Shostakovich
Russian black-and-white films
1930s Russian-language films